The Borgu Emirate is a Nigerian traditional state with its capital in New Bussa, Niger State, Nigeria. The Emirate was formed in 1954 when the Bussa and Kaiama emirates were merged. These emirates, with Illa, were formerly part of the Borgu state, which was partitioned between the French colony of Benin and the British protectorate of Nigeria in 1898.

Rulers

Bussa
A partial list of rulers of Bussa, who took the title Kibe, and later were also styled Sarkin Bussa (Emir of Bussa):

Kaiama
A partial list of rulers of Kaiama, who were styled Sarkin Kaiama (Emir of Kaiama):

Borgu Kingdom
Emirs of Borgu since 1954, styled Sarkin Borgu:

References

Nigerian traditional states
History of Nigeria
Emirates